Thomas Abbott may refer to:

 Thomas Eastoe Abbott (1786–1854), English poet
 Thomas Abbott (priest), Irish priest, Archdeacon of Cloyne, 1919–1936
 Thomas Kingsmill Abbott (1829–1913), Irish scholar and educator